Ugwuoba is the gateway town into Enugu State from southern Nigeria. It is a border town on the bank of Oji River in Oji River Local Government Area of Enugu State, Nigeria. Ugwuoba is for its arable land for agricultural utilities. The town is known for its gas reserves within the gas-rich Anambra Basin, Southeastern Nigeria. There is also the popular Ugwuoba clay deposits that could serve as effective Zinc ion adsorbent. Ugwuoba is rich in cultural and social life activities. Ugwuoba is made up of seventeen (17) villages which includes: Upata, Okwe, Agungwu, Aguabosi, Mkpagu, Eziachi, Okpuno, Ude, Egbeagu, Agolo, Obinagu, Efulu, Ogbudu, Umualu, Agungwu-ogboo, Umuonwu and Aniocha. The Ojinator and Dodo community is an extension of Okwe.

High Chief Osita Omah is the present President General of Ugwuoba Development Union, the executive leadership of the town.

Boundaries
Ugwuoba is bounded by Amansea to West, Oji River urban on the East, Ozzu Ndiukwuenu and  Agbalaenyi to the South and Obinofia Ndiagu to the North.

Economy
The people of Ugwuoba are notable farmers. The Mamu Forest Reserve is an annex of the Ugwuoba land. There is a federal agricultural research settlement in Agungwu and Aguabosi villages. One of the popular markets of the town is the Ugwuoba Garki cattle market. The market is strategically located around the border of Enugu and Anambra States along the Enugu-Onitsha expressway. Afor Market Ugwuoba attracts traders from Awka, Oji-River urban, Enugu and its environs.

The town is home to Akukwa field in the OPL 907 area, first drilled by Shell in 1938 – 1939. Thereafter, the gas field recorded further successful drills by Shell-BP in 1955 and 1956.

References

Towns in Enugu State